The auxiliary particle filter is a particle filtering algorithm introduced by Pitt and Shephard in 1999 to improve some deficiencies of the sequential importance resampling (SIR) algorithm when dealing with tailed observation densities.

Motivation 
Particle filters approximate continuous random variable by  particles with discrete probability mass , say  for uniform distribution. The random sampled particles can be used to approximate the probability density function of the continuous random variable if the value . 

The empirical prediction density is produced as the weighted summation of these particles:

, and we can view it as the "prior" density. Note that the particles are assumed to have the same weight .

Combining the prior density  and the likelihood , the empirical filtering density can be produced as:

, where .

On the other hand, the true filtering density which we want to estimate is

.

The prior density   can be used to approximate the true filtering density :

 The particle filters draw  samples from the prior density . Each sample are drawn with equal probability.
Assign each sample with the weights .  The weights represent the likelihood function .
 If the number , than the samples converge to the desired true filtering density.
The  particles are resampled to  particles with the weight .

The weakness of the particle filters includes: 

 If the weight {} has a large variance, the sample amount  must be large enough for the samples to approximate the empirical filtering density. In other words, while the weight is widely distributed, the SIR method will be imprecise and the adaption is difficult.

Therefore, the auxiliary particle filter is proposed to solve this problem.

Auxiliary particle filter

Auxiliary variable 
Comparing with the empirical filtering density which has , 

we now define , where . 

Being aware that  is formed by the summation of  particles, the auxiliary variable  represents one specific particle. The samples are ultimately utilized to approximate . 

Take the SIR method for example:

Assign each samples with the weight .
Similarly, the  particles are resampled to  particles with the weight .

The original particle filters draw samples from the prior density, while the auxiliary filters draw from the joint distribution of the prior density and the likelihood. In other words, the auxiliary particle filters avoid the circumstance which the particles are generated in the regions with low likelihood. As a result, the samples can approximate  more precisely.

Selection of the auxiliary variable 
The selection of the auxiliary variable affects  and controls the distribution of the samples.

 Moreover, we reassign the second-stage weights   as the probabilities of the  samples, where  .

 Finally, the  particles are resampled to  particles with the weights . 

Since  is closely related to the mean , it has high conditional likelihood. As a result, the sampling procedure is more efficient and the value  can be reduced.

Other point of view 
Assume that the filtered posterior is described by the following M weighted samples:

 

Then, each step in the algorithm consists of first drawing a sample of the particle index  which will be propagated from  into the new step . These indexes are auxiliary variables only used as an intermediary step, hence the name of the algorithm. The indexes are drawn according to the likelihood of some reference point  which in some way is related to the transition model  (for example, the mean, a sample, etc.):

 

 

Finally, the weights are updated to account for the mismatch between the likelihood at the actual sample and the predicted point :

References

Sources
 

Monte Carlo methods
Computational statistics
Nonlinear filters